The Ferdinand E. Marcos Memorial Stadium, also known as Marcos Stadium, is a football and track stadium in Laoag, Ilocos Norte.

History
The site of the present Marcos Stadium was occupied by Mariano Marcos Stadium, an older stadium. The older Marcos Stadium, a 2,000-seater venue, was significantly damaged by Typhoon Mangkhut (Ompong) in 2018. Its roof were blown off and its windows shattered. The old stadium was demolished to make way for the construction of a newer stadium.

The new Marcos Stadium was part of the "Big 3" project under Ilocos Norte Governor Imee Marcos, along with Dap-ayan Food Park, and Provincial Capitol expansion.

The stadium was inaugurated on February 24, 2023 for the Tan-ok Festival.

Facilities

The Marcos Stadium was designed by WTA Architecture and Design Studio. It has a seating capacity of 12,000.

See also
Laoag, Ilocos Norte
List of football stadiums in the Philippines

References

Sports complexes in the Philippines
Football venues in the Philippines
Buildings and structures in Laoag